Emu Heights is a suburb of Sydney, in the state of New South Wales, Australia. Emu Heights is located 58 kilometres west of the Sydney central business district, in the local government area of the City of Penrith.

Emu Heights sits on the land of the  Dharug people, who are the traditional owners of the area.

Sitting on the base of the Blue Mountains escarpment and on the western side of the Nepean river, the suburb is just outside the Sydney metropolitan area.

It is bounded to the north by the Nepean River, to the east (at Russell St) and south (at Great Western Railway) by the suburb of Emu Plains and to the west by the City of Blue Mountains local government area.

History
The Dharug people inhabited the land now known as Emu Heights and are the traditional owners of the land.

Emu Heights was established by George Innes, a free settler from Bathurst who obtained  in 1831, near McCann's Island and named it Emu Heights. However, the name "Emu Heights" wasn't officially assigned to the neighbourhood until early 1976.

Schools 
Emu Heights Public School was founded in 1972. The school had only eighty seven pupils and three teachers, but now has over three hundred students enrolled. The school's teaching revolves around seven Key Learning Areas, English, Mathematics, Science, ICT, Human society and its environment, the Creative Arts and Personal Health and Social Development.

Parks 
Clissold Park is host to great diversity of Australia's fauna and flora and features basketball, netball and children's playground facilities.  The park does not have formal field sporting facilities but is more than large enough for such and regularly used by the close knit people of Emu Heights for community events. 
There is a peaceful stream that flows down from the mountain escarpment, though this stream has been recorded to flood the whole park and north along Wedmore Rd in major storms.  (The stream was diverted east by housing developers in the 1980s who followed a farmers drainage channel rather that the original flow north beside Wedmore Rd to the Nepean river).

A larger unnamed parkland also exists at the north end of Emu Heights, between the suburb and the Nepean River, giving wide access to the river.  Sporting fields and golf facilities are being considered for this parkland.  Fishing and canoeing are popular as this section of the river is not used by power boats.  The section of river accessible from Emu Heights is home to a large variety of native and migratory waterbirds.  In the early 1960s, the native egg laying mammal the platypus could still be found in this section of the river but has since become extinct.

Population
According to the 2016 census of Population, there were 3,289 people in Emu Heights.
 Aboriginal and Torres Strait Islander people made up 3.4% of the population. 
 85.3% of people were born in Australia. The next most common country of birth was England at 4.0%.   
 93.0% of people spoke only English at home. 
 The most common responses for religion were Catholic 32.6%, No Religion 24.0% and Anglican 22.6%
 The most common ancestries were English 30.4%, Australian 30.1%, Irish 10.5%, Scottish 7.9% and German 3.2%.
 Of occupied private dwellings in Emu Heights, 98.6% were separate houses.

References 

Suburbs of Sydney
City of Penrith